Ocean Shores is a city in Grays Harbor County, Washington, United States. The population was 6,715 at the 2020 census.

History

The City of Ocean Shores occupies the Point Brown peninsula on the Washington coast.  Long before the arrival of European explorers and settlers, the peninsula was used by the various local tribes for trading and other purposes. The Chinook, Chehalis, and Quinault tribes used the area, as well as others that now make up the Quinault Indian Nation.

On May 7, 1792, Captain Robert Gray sailed into the bay and named the area Bullfinch Harbor. Later, Captain George Vancouver renamed the area Grays Harbor after Captain Gray. The first established white settler on the Point was Matthew McGee, who settled in the early 1860s. He sold the southern portion of the peninsula to A.O. Damon in 1878 for a trading supply center whose dock extended into the Oyehut channel. A.O. Damon took over the entire peninsula from McGee, and the land was passed along to his grandson, Ralph Minard, who used the area as a cattle ranch from 1929 until he sold to the Ocean Shores Development Corporation in 1960 for $1,000,000.

At the time the Washington State legislature was considering legalizing some forms of gambling.  In expectation of a huge casino development, the Ocean Shores Development Corporation opened their sale of lots in a travel trailer parked in the dunes. Soon the word spread about the California-style development of the place called Ocean Shores. Lots began at $595 and were sold sight unseen from the first plat maps. As the numbers of lots sold rose, the prices rose. Property lots were staked and numbered only as the road construction crews began to lay out the massive road system. Even though the first roads were only  in length, the downtown area had mercury vapor lights to show that this was a booming city. In the first year 25 homes were constructed and their owners had charter membership certificates in the Ocean Shores Community Club.

As the development grew, the Ginny Simms Restaurant and Nightclub brought in the Hollywood set. In fact, on its opening night, chartered planes flew up a whole contingent of Hollywood stars, and 11,000 people turned out at Bowerman Basin to see the celebrities.

By December 1960,  of canals were planned, a six-hole golf course was drawing players, and the mall shopping area was ready for the 1961 Ocean Shores Estates construction boom. The mall, 100 motel units, three restaurants and an airstrip sprang up from the sandy ground, with the marina opening in 1963. The SS Catala was brought up from California to become a "boatel" and charter fleet office. Two years later a southwest winter storm drove her into the sand and for many years she was the most famous shipwreck on the Washington Coast. In 1966 the gates to the city were installed.

Pat Boone became a local resident in 1967 as a stockholder in Ocean Shores Estates Incorporated, and promotion of the development was sped along by the Celebrity Golf tournaments hosted by Boone.

By 1969, Ocean Shores was declared the "richest little city" per capita in the country, with an assessed valuation of $35 million and 900 permanent residents. The following year the city was incorporated and a planning commission was formed to zone the city and codify streets. The city's first school opened in 1971 and road paving began in earnest.

During the 1970s, the town struggled through many setbacks brought on mainly by the state's economic recession. By the 1980s, the slump was over and construction of homes and businesses accelerated again.

Geography

Climate
Ocean Shores experiences an oceanic climate (Köppen climate classification Cfb), with tendencies towards a Mediterranean (Köppen Csb), notably the pattern of a wetter winter and moderately drier summer.

The climate is similar to nearby Aberdeen, situated slightly farther inland, but Ocean Shores experiences a narrower range of temperatures and is significantly less susceptible to extremes of heat in the summer, caused by hotter, inland air masses being pushed into the region.

Demographics

2010 census
At the census of 2010, there were 5,569 people in 2,707 households, including 1,657 families, in the city. The racial makeup of the city was 90.2% White, 0.9% African American, 2.1% Native American, 1.7% Asian, 0.2% Pacific Islander, 0.6% from other races, and 4.2% from two or more races. Hispanic or Latino of any race were 3.2%.

Of the 2,707 households 14.6% had children under the age of 18 living with them, 49.9% were married couples living together, 7.8% had a female householder with no husband present, 3.4% had a male householder with no wife present, and 38.8% were non-families. 30.5% of households were one person and 14.4% were one person aged 65 or older. The average household size was 2.06 and the average family size was 2.49.

The median age was 57.3 years. 12.6% of residents were under the age of 18; 4.9% were between the ages of 18 and 24; 14% were from 25 to 44; 37.5% were from 45 to 64; and 31.1% were 65 or older. The gender makeup of the city was 48.3% male and 51.7% female.

2000 census
At the census of 2000, there were 3,836 people in 1,789 households, including 1,198 families, in the city. The population density was 444.7 people per square mile (171.6/km). There were 3,170 housing units at an average density of 367.5 per square mile (141.8/km). The racial makeup of the city was 92.44% White, 0.60% African American, 2.19% Native American, 1.23% Asian, 0.10% Pacific Islander, 0.81% from other races, and 2.63% from two or more races. The city experienced an influx of West Midland residents in the late 1990s. Hispanic or Latino of any race was 1.75% of the population. 17.4% were of German, 13.9% Irish, 12.0% English, 9.6% American, and 8.0% Norwegian ancestry.

There were 1,789 households, of which 17.8% had children under the age of 18 living with them, 56.7% were married couples living together, 7.1% had a female householder with no husband present, and 33.0% were non-families. 27.7% of households were one person and 12.6% were one person aged 65 or older. The average household size was 2.14 and the average family size was 2.55.

The age distribution was 16.8% under the age of 18, 4.6% from 18 to 24, 18.9% from 25 to 44, 31.7% from 45 to 64, and 28.0% 65 or older. The median age was 52 years. For every 100 females, there were 93.4 males. For every 100 females age 18 and over, there were 91.6 males.

The median household income was $34,643 and the median family income was $38,520. Males had a median income of $31,371 versus $25,393 for females. The per capita income for the city was $19,192. About 9.8% of families and 12.4% of the population were below the poverty line, including 22.1% of those under age 18 and 3.8% of those ages 65 or over.

Schools
Ocean Shores is served by the North Beach School District, which operates a high school, a middle school and an elementary school in the area.

Transportation
Ocean Shores is connected to the rest of the county by State Route 115, which connects Point Brown Avenue to State Route 109.

The city is also served by Grays Harbor Transit bus route 60, which travels east to Hoquiam and Aberdeen and north to Taholah on the Quinault Indian Reservation, and a dial-a-ride route for in-city service.

Death on the Fourth of July
The book Death on the Fourth of July by David Neiwert documents a racially charged killing which took place in Ocean Shores on July 4, 2000. A group of young Asian-American men who were visiting Ocean Shores spent that July 4 weekend there when they were attacked by a group of white men. One of the Asians, Minh Duc Hong, fatally stabbed Chris Kinison, who was from the Ocean Shores area. Hong was arrested and tried for manslaughter.  His trial ended in a hung jury, 11–1 in favor of acquittal; prosecutors decided not to retry the case.

References

External links

 City of Ocean Shores official website
 "Asian American Groups Seek FBI Probe of Ocean Shores Stabbing", AsianWeek.com, October 2000 (story at the bottom of the page)

 
Cities in Grays Harbor County, Washington
Cities in Washington (state)
Populated coastal places in Washington (state)